Pilgrims is a musical group from Valladolid, Spain. It is often included as one of the pillars in the independent scene of Valladolid music. Their music has been described as "funk rock".

The band has four members: Nikolas East (guitarist and lead singer) and Daniel Birch (saxophonist) from the UK, and Miguel Ángel Cubillo (bassist) and Daniel Clérigo (drummer) from Spain.

Their first recorded project was the EP Half Breed Sunrise, submitted in November 2010.

References 

Funk rock musical groups